Worsham is a hamlet on the River Windrush about  west of Witney.   east of Worsham on the north side of the Windrush are the remains of a small Roman house. In later history Worsham was the site of a water mill. The area also has two Cotswold stone quarries, both now disused.

Sources

References

Hamlets in Oxfordshire
West Oxfordshire District